The Rutland Formation is a geologic formation in England. It preserves fossils dating back to the late Bajocian to Bathonian stages in the Jurassic period, about 169 million years ago. It is the lateral equivalent of the Sharp's Hill Formation and the Fuller's Earth Formation. The "Rutland Dinosaur" specimen of Cetiosaurus is known from the formation.

Paleobiota

See also

 List of fossiliferous stratigraphic units in England
 List of dinosaur-bearing rock formations

References

External links
 Rutland Formation, Fossilworks Search for Rutland in 'Stratigraphic units'.

Geologic formations of England
Middle Jurassic Europe
Jurassic England
Jurassic System of Europe
Bathonian Stage